The Vivekananda Vidyapith Academy of Indian Philosophy and Culture is a school in Wayne, New Jersey. It is a non-profitable organization created in 1976 that teaches Sanskrit; Indian & Hindu Philosophy; teaches the life of Sri Ramakrishna, Sri Sarada Devi, and Swami Vivekananda; and more to grades Kindergarten to 12.

Vivekananda Vidyapith takes its philosophical inspiration from Swami Vivekananda, a nineteenth and early twentieth-century teacher and explorer of Vedanta, or Indian philosophy. The Vidyapith’s closest sister organization is the Ramakrishna-Vivekananda Center in New York City.

History

In 1976, Dr. Mahendra Jani was studying for his doctoral degree in mathematics at CUNY, and his wife, Dr. Vandana Jani was teaching at Kean College. They lived in Elizabeth, New Jersey, and regularly attended services and classes held by Swami Adiswarananda at the Ramakrishna-Vivekananda Center in New York. During that time, they held prayers and scripture-study classes with a few families on Saturday evenings in friends' houses in Jersey City. Soon, the need arose to occupy the children of the families, including their son, during these sessions.

Mrs. Jani took the children to a separate room and engaged them in instructional activities. At the end of the classes, children presented what they had learned. After a couple of weeks, both Vandana and Mahendra Jani decided to hold separate classes for children on Saturday mornings and provide them with a "character building education." Both of them prepared a curriculum, and in September 1976, started classes for children on Saturdays, from 9 a.m. to 1 p.m. in their one-bedroom-apartment in Elizabeth. There were seven children on the first day.

Soon, more and more adults valued the opportunity to bring their children for instruction, and the idea for an ongoing cultural educational program for children started. After one year, the Janis moved to Jersey City, where the majority of students who were attending the program resided. In 1979, the Janis rented a large basement apartment in order to facilitate more children. They incorporated the Vivekananda Vidyapith that same year. When the owner of the house sold the property, the Janis were forced to move to a house in Woodland Park, New Jersey.

As participant families continued to grow in number, the corporation started to look for a facility to house the Vidyapith in 1988. After a two-year search, they found the current house, situated on approximately one acre of land in Wayne, NJ. They rented the facility for one year during 1990, but it was not until they received proper zoning as a “house of worship” that they could begin using the facility for classes in 1991. The Board of the Vidyapith purchased the property in 1991.

In 2000, they built a two-story addition on the facility, with classrooms on the first floor and a prayer hall on the second floor. The hall seats approximately 200 people. There is currently an enrollment cap of approximately 200 students, and there is also a waiting list for next year’s program. The Vidyapith has a mailing list of 1200 families, and the average attendance on the two weekend morning sessions totals approximately 350 people, mostly children. There are evening classes for adults during the week.

Activities and Schedule
An average weekend session begins with group prayer in the prayer hall, including the singing of aarti and the recitation of prayers. This also includes a long talk by Dr. Mahendra Jani, followed by a felicitation of children who are celebrating birthdays, and a welcome to young alumni of the program who come to visit. Besides the educational programs on weekends, the Vidyapith celebrates the major Indian religious festivals with special celebrations. Christmas and Buddha’s birthday are also celebrated. Also, every year, the Vidyapith celebrates its founding with a large cultural program, including dance, music, and dramas. Students’ speech competitions are held every year. These larger programs are held in local public school auditoriums, such as the Diwali Function. In 2001, the Vidyapith celebrated its 25th anniversary, and celebrated its 30th anniversary in 2006 with a special alumni reunion, where over 100 alumni and their families reunited from the class of 1976 to the present.

Philosophy
The Vivekananda Vidyapith is a volunteer, non-profit organization. The Board of Directors consists of eleven people who meet two to three times a year. The organization emphasizes the teachings of Swami Vivekananda, and strives to teach proper values and character building.

Although religious in nature, the instruction emphasizes what Dr. Jani refers to as the science of character development. The focus is on the inner spiritual search expounded by Vedanta, but not on rituals or dogma. The philosophy is meant to be inclusive and encourages students to serve society around them.

See also
Education
Indian Americans
New Jersey
Philosophy
2005 concert series, with Kedar Naphade
Namesake schools and colleges exist, notably in India, including in Dhubri Durgapur, Habra, and Udaipur, Tripura

External links
Vidyapith's homepage

Education in New Jersey
Private schools in New Jersey
Hindu organizations
Ramakrishna Mission
Religious organizations based in the United States